Frederik I may refer to:

Frederick I of Denmark (1471–1533)
Frederick I of Sweden (1676–1751)

See also 
 Frederick I (disambiguation)